Leo García may refer to:

 Leo García (singer) (born 1970), Argentine singer
 Leo García (baseball) (born 1962), Dominican-born Major League Baseball player